Lentibacillus persicus is a Gram-positive, endospore-forming, moderately halophilic and facultatively anaerobic bacterium from the genus of Lentibacillus which has been isolated from water from the lake Aran-Bidgol in Iran.

References

Bacillaceae
Bacteria described in 2010